Hori Ahipene is an actor and director in theatre, film and television in New Zealand. He's also an award-winning playwright with the Māori play Hide 'n Seek co-written with Hone Kouka. He became a well known face in New Zealand for his dramatic performances in films such as Jubilee (2000) as well as parts in The Piano (1993) and a guest role Xena:Warrior Princess in 2001. A versatile actor he has also played lead roles in television sketch series including the 1990s hit Skitz, The Semisis, Telly Laughs and Away Laughing. Most recently he was in the core cast of Maddigan's Quest and currently playing the role of Angel in the television drama Outrageous Fortune. He is an accomplished director with more than 15 years in the arts industry. He was a senior director on Skitz as well as long running Māori-language programmes Korero Mai and Pukana. He was a creator and co-writer of the sitcom B&B with comedian Te Radar for Māori Television.

Ahipene studied acting at Toi Whakaari New Zealand Drama School. He graduated in 1989 with a Diploma in Acting. He has worked in theatre as an actor and as a theatre director.

Filmography

Film

Television

References

External links

Profile & Screenographyy NZ On Screen

Living people
New Zealand male Māori actors
New Zealand male film actors
20th-century New Zealand dramatists and playwrights
Year of birth missing (living people)
New Zealand theatre directors
New Zealand television directors
Toi Whakaari alumni
Te Aitanga-a-Hauiti people
Ngāti Raukawa people
Ngāti Kahungunu people
New Zealand male soap opera actors
20th-century New Zealand male actors
21st-century New Zealand male actors
21st-century New Zealand dramatists and playwrights
New Zealand male dramatists and playwrights